Teller Cigar Factory, also known as Sprecht Clothing Company, is a historic factory building located at Sellersville, Bucks County, Pennsylvania. The original section was built about 1866, and expanded in 1895.  The original section is a -story, stone structure and the addition a -story, brick structure.  Both structures are plastered and have gable roofs.  The building is 10 bays wide and 4 bays deep.  It represents the transition of the cigar industry from home manufacture to being housed in large manufacturing facilities.  It was occupied by a cigar manufacturer at least into the 1920s, and later used as a warehouse for a plumbing and heating supply company.

It was added to the National Register of Historic Places in 1987.

Gallery

References

Industrial buildings and structures on the National Register of Historic Places in Pennsylvania
Industrial buildings completed in 1866
Industrial buildings completed in 1895
Buildings and structures in Bucks County, Pennsylvania
Historic cigar factories
Tobacco buildings in the United States
1866 establishments in Pennsylvania
National Register of Historic Places in Bucks County, Pennsylvania